Wyoming Highway 136 (WYO 136) is a  long east–west Wyoming State Road in Fremont County.

Route description
Wyoming Highway 136, named Gas Hills Road, begins at Wyoming Highway 135 south of Riverton. From there, Highway 136 travels east, crosses into the Wind River Indian Reservation and on into the Gas Hills Uranium Mining District. WYO 136 reaches its eastern end at a T-intersection with Fremont CR 5 (Dry Creek Road). Highway 136 provides access to Castle Gardens
Prehistoric Site where hundreds of prehistoric carvings can be viewed on the sandstone rock.

Major intersections

References

External links 

Wyoming State Routes 100-199
WYO 136 - WYO 135 to Fremont CR 5
Wyoming Highway 136

Transportation in Fremont County, Wyoming
136